This bibliography of Adolf Hitler is an English only non-fiction bibliography. There are thousands of books written about Hitler; therefore, this is not an all-inclusive list. The list has been segregated into groups to make the list more manageable.

Written by Adolf Hitler
 Hitler, A. (1925). Mein Kampf.
 Hitler, A. (1935). Zweites Buch (trans.) Hitler's Second Book: The Unpublished Sequel to Mein Kampf by Adolf Hitler. (Enigma Books: New York, 2006. )
 Hitler, A. (1945). My Political Testament. Wikisource Version
 Hitler, A. (1945). My Private Will and Testament. Wikisource Version

Co-written by Hitler or containing words by Hitler 
 
 Hitler, A., et al. (1971). Unmasked: Two Confidential Interviews with Hitler in 1931. Chatto & Windus. 
 Hitler, A., et al. (1974). Hitler's Letters and Notes. Harper & Row. 
 Hitler, A., et al. (2000). Hitler's Table Talk Enigma Books. 
 Hitler, A. (1964). Hitler's War Directives, 1939–45. Sidgwick and Jackson.

Hitler's speeches

 Baynes, N. (1942). The Speeches of Adolf Hitler, April 1922 – August 1939 V1. London, Oxford University Press. 
 Baynes, N. (1942). The Speeches of Adolf Hitler, April 1922 – August 1939 V2. London: Oxford University Press. 
 Domarus, Max (1990). Hitler: Speeches and Proclamations 1932–1945 – The Chronicle of a Dictatorship (4 vols.) Bolchazy-Carducci Publishers, Inc. 
 Miguel, M. (2004). Hitler: Speeches and Proclamations 1941–1945 V4. Miguel Melo Phipps Publishers, Inc. 
 Domarus, M., Romane, P., ed. (2007). The Essential Hitler: Speeches and Commentary.  
 Domarus, M. (2007). The Complete Hitler: A Digital Desktop Reference to His Speeches & Proclamations 1932–1945. 
 Prange, Gordon W. (1944).  Hitler's Words: Two Decades of National Socialism, 1923–1942. American Council on Public Affairs.  
 Roussy de Sales, Raoul de. (1973) [1941]. My New Order: A collection of Hitler's Speeches. Octagon Books.

Biographies of Hitler

 Bullock, Alan (1971, Abridged) [1952]. Hitler: A Study in Tyranny. Bantam Books. 
 Cross, Colin (1973). Adolf Hitler. Hodder and Stoughton. 
 Davidson, Eugene (1977). The Making of Adolf Hitler. Macmillan Pub. Co. 
 Davidson, Eugene (1996). Unmaking of Adolf Hitler. Univ. of Missouri Pr. 
 Eberle, Henrik & Uhl, Matthias (2005). The Hitler Book: The Secret Dossier Prepared for Stalin from the Interrogations of Hitler's Personal Aides. New York: Public Affairs. 
 Fest, Joachim (2002) [1974]. Hitler. Harvest Books. 
 Fuchs, Thomas (2000). A Concise Biography of Adolf Hitler. Berkley. 
 Giblin, James (2002). The Life and Death of Adolf Hitler. Clarion Books. 
 Gogerly, Liz (2003). Adolf Hitler. Heinemann/Raintree. 
 
 Heiden, Konrad (1944). Der Fuehrer: Hitler's Rise to Power. Beacon Press. 
 Heiden, Konrad (1936). Hitler: A Biography. A.A. Knopf.
 Heyes, Eileen (1994). Adolf Hitler. Millbrook Pr. 
 Housden, Martyn (2000). Hitler: Study of a Revolutionary?. Routledge. 
 
 
 
 
 Marrin, Albert (1987). Hitler. Penguin Books  
 Maser, Werner (1973). Hitler: Legend, Myth & Reality. Harper & Row. 
 Payne, Robert (1973). The Life and Death of Adolf Hitler. Cape. 
 Price, Billy F. (1984). Adolf Hitler: The Unknown Artist. Stephen Cook. 
 Shirer, William (1961). The Rise and Fall of Adolf Hitler. Scholastic. 
 Simms, Brendan (2019). Hitler: A Global Biography. Allen Lane. 
 Smith, Bradley F. (1967). Adolf Hitler: His Family, Childhood, and Youth. Hoover Institution Press. 
 Stalcup, Brenda (2000). Adolf Hitler. Greenhaven Pr. 
 Stern, J. P. (1992) [1975]. Hitler: The Führer and the People. Berkeley and Los Angeles: University of California Press, 1992. 
 Tames, Richard (1998). Adolf Hitler: An Unauthorized Biography. Heinemann Library. 
 Toland, John (1976). Adolf Hitler. Doubleday. 
 Ullrich, Volker (2016). Hitler: Volume I: Ascent (1889–1939). The Bodley Head Ltd. 
 Ullrich, Volker (2020). Hitler: Volume II: Downfall (1939–45). The Bodley Head Ltd. 
 Weber, Thomas (2017) Becoming Hitler: The Making of a Nazi. New York: Basic Books. 
 Wepman, Dennis (1989). Adolf Hitler. Chelsea House Pub. 
 Williams, John F. (2005). Corporal Hitler and the Great War 1914–1918: The List Regiment. Frank Cass. 
 Wilson, A. N. (2012). Hitler: A Short Biography. Basic Books.

Illustrations of Hitler

 Cigaretten Bilderdienst (1979) [1936]. Adolf Hitler: Pictures of the Life of the Fuhrer. Northstar Commemoratives. 
 Blundell, Nigel (1995). Pictorial History of Adolf Hitler. World Pubns. 
 Hoffmann, Heinrich (1937). Hitler off Duty.  
 Hoffmann, Heinrich (1939). The Face of the Fuhrer. 
 Hoffmann, Heinrich (1939). With Hitler in Poland. 
 Hoffmann, Heinrich (2015). With Hitler in the West. Pen & Sword.  
 Hook, Alex (2004). Illustrated History of the Third Reich. TAJ Books. 
 Kelly, Maurice E. (1990). Adolf Hitler. Olympic Marketing Corp. 
 Lang, Jochen (1973). Hitler Close-Up: Hitler in Words and Pictures  Macmillan. 
 Lorant, Stefan (1979). Sieg Heil: An illustrated history of Germany from Bismarck to Hitler. Bonanza Books. 
 Matanle, Ivor (1983). Adolf Hitler: A Photographic Documentary. Crescent Books, New York. 
 Toland, John (1978). Hitler: The Pictorial Documentary of His Life  Doubleday.

Medical studies of Hitler

 Binion, Rudolph (1976). Hitler Among the Germans. Northern Illinois University Press. 
 
 Eberle, Henrik & Neumann, Hans-Joachim (2012). Was Hitler ILL?: A Final Diagnosis. Polity. 
 Heston, Leonard L. (1980). The Medical Casebook of Adolf Hitler: His Illnesses, Doctors, and Drugs. Stein & Day Pub. 
 Langer, Walter C. (1972).The Mind of Adolf Hitler: The Secret Wartime Report. Basic Books. 
 Lewis, David (2004). The Man Who Invented Hitler: The Making of the Fuhrer (sic). Headline Book Publishing. 
 Murray, Henry A. (1943). Analysis of the Personality of Adolph Hitler: With Predictions of His Future Behavior and Suggestions for Dealing with Him Now and After Germany's Surrender.
 Rosenbaum, Ron (1999). Explaining Hitler: The Search for the Origins of His Evil. Harper Perennial. 
 
 
 Victor, George (1999). Hitler: The Pathology of Evil. Potomac Books. 
 Waite, Robert (1993) [1977]. The Psychopathic God: Adolf Hitler. Da Capo Press.

Hitler's diet

 Berry, Rynn (2004). Hitler: Neither Vegetarian Nor Animal Lover. Pythagorean Books. 
 Ferguson, Ron (2001). Hitler Was A Vegetarian. Famedram Publishers Ltd. 
 Wilson, B. (1996). Mein Diat; Adolf Hitler's Diet [sic] New Statesman, volume 127 issue 4406 page 40.

Directly related to Hitler

 Anderson, Ken (1995). Hitler and the Occult. Prometheus Books. 
 Boldt, Gerhard (1973). Hitler's Last Ten Days: An Eye-Witness Account.  .  Translated by Sandra Bance.
 Bullock, Alan (1991). Hitler and Stalin: Parallel Lives. HarperCollins. 
 Carr, William (1978). Hitler: A Study in Personality and Politics. Edward Arnold. 
 
 Corvaja, Santi (2001). Hitler and Mussolini: The Secret Meetings. Enigma Books. 
 Dupuy, Trevor N. (1969). Military Life of Adolf Hitler, Führer of Germany. F. Watts. 
 Evans, Richard J. (1989). In Hitler's Shadow: West German Historians and the Attempt to Escape from the Nazi Past. Pantheon. 
 Evans, Richard J. (2001). Lying About Hitler: History, Holocaust, and the David Irving Trial. Basic Books. 
 Haffner, Sebastian (1983). The Meaning of Hitler Harvard University Press. 
 
 Hamann, Brigitte (2000). Hitler's Vienna. Oxford University Press. 
 Jäckel, Eberhard  (2000) [1969]. Hitler's World View: A Blueprint for Power. Oxford University Press. 
 Joachimsthaler, Anton (1999) [1995]. The Last Days of Hitler: Legend, Evidence and Truth. Brockhampton Press. 
 Kershaw, Ian (1987) The 'Hitler Myth': Image and Reality in the Third Reich. Oxford University Press. 
  Knopp, Guido (2004).  Hitler's Children. Sutton Publishing. 
 Knopp, Guido (1998). Hitler's Henchmen. Sutton Publishing. 
 Lively, Scott (1995). The Pink Swastika. Online Version Veritas Aeterna Press. 
 Lukacs, John (1998). The Hitler of History. Vintage. 
 Lee, Stephen J. (1998). Hitler and Nazi Germany. Routledge. 
 Machtan, Lothar (2001). The Hidden Hitler Hitler. Basic Book. 
 McDonough, Frank (2003). Hitler and the Rise of the Nazi Party. Longman. 
 Mitcham, Samuel W., Jr. (1996). Why Hitler?: The Genesis of the Third Reich. Westport, Connecticut: Praeger. 
 Moorhouse, Roger (2006). Killing Hitler. Cape. 
 Novak, Ben (2014). Hitler and Abductive Logic: The Strategy of a Tyrant. Lexington Books. 
 Petrova, Ada (1995). The Death of Hitler: The Full Story With New Evidence from Secret Russian Archives. W. W. Norton & Co Inc. 
  . Lyons Press.
 Rees, Laurence (2012). The Dark Charisma of Adolf Hitler: Leading Millions into the Abyss. Ebury Publishing. 
 Rich, Norman (1992). Hitler's War Aims: Ideology, the Nazi State, and the Course of Expansion. W. W. Norton & Company. 
 Roberts, Stephen (1938).  The House That Hitler Built. Harper & Brothers.
 Rosenfeld, Alvin (1985) Imagining Hitler Indiana University Press. 
 Ryback, Timothy W. (2008). Hitler's Private Library: The Books that Shaped his Life Alfred A. Knopf. 
 Sayer, Ian (2004). The Women Who Knew Hitler: The Private Life of Adolf Hitler. Carroll & Graf. 
 Schramm, Percy Ernst (1971). Hitler: The Man and the Military Leader Quadrangle Books. 
 Snyder, Louis (1961). Hitler and Nazism. Franklin Watts Inc. 
 Spielvogel, Jackson J. (2004). Hitler and Nazi Germany: A History. Prentice Hall. 
 Spotts, Frederic (2004) [2002]. Hitler and the Power of Aesthetics. Overlook Press. 
 Stackelberg, Roderick (1999). Hitler's Germany. Routledge. 
 Stratigakos, Despina (2015). Hitler at Home. Yale University Press – analyzing his homes in Berlin, Munich, and Obersalzberg
 
 Trevor-Roper, H. (1992) [1947]. The Last Days of Hitler. University Of Chicago Press. 
 
 Weinberg, Gerhard L. (2010). Hitler's Foreign Policy, 1933–1939: The Road to World War II. Enigma Books. 
 Welch, David (2001). Hitler: Profile of a Dictator. Routledge. 
 Wiskemann, Elizabeth (1949). The Rome-Berlin Axis: A History of the Relations between Hitler and Mussolini. Oxford University Press.
 Wistrich, Robert (2003). Hitler and the Holocaust. Modern Library. .
 Zitelmann, Rainer (2000) [1987]. Hitler: The Policies of Seduction. London House 2000, .

Indirectly related to Hitler

 Aly, Götz (2005). Hitler's Beneficiaries: Plunder, Racial War, and the Nazi Welfare State. Metropolitan. 
 Bracher, K.D. (1970).The German Dictatorship: The Origins, Structure, and Effects of National Socialism. New York: Praeger Publishers. 
 Broszat, Martin (1987). Hitler and the Collapse of Weimar Germany Translated by V. R. Berghahn. Providence: Berg. .
 Broszat, Martin (2001). The Hitler State: The Foundation and Development Of The Internal Structure Of The Third Reich. Longman. .
 Burleigh, Michael, Wippermann, Wolfgang (1991). The Racial State: Germany 1933–1945. Cambridge University Press. 
 
 
 
 
 Deist, Wilhelm, Messerschmidt, Manfred, Wette, Wolfram et al. (2008). Germany and the Second World War. Deutsche Verlags-Anstalt.
 
 Fest, Joachim (2004). Inside Hitler's Bunker: The Last Days of the Third Reich. Farrar, Straus and Giroux. 
 Fest, Joachim (1996). Plotting Hitler's Death: The German Resistance to Hitler, 1933–1945. Weidenfeld & Nicolson. 
 Frei, Norbert (1993). National Socialist Rule in Germany: The Führer State 1933–1945. Blackwell Pub. 
 Herzstein, Robert E. (1974). Adolf Hitler and the German Trauma, 1913–1945;: An Interpretation of the Nazi Phenomenon. Putnam. 
 
 Kershaw, Ian (2000). The Nazi Dictatorship: Problems and Perspectives of Interpretation. Arnold Publishers. 
 Levenda, Peter (2005). Unholy Alliance: A History of Nazi Involvement with the Occult. Continuum. 
 Ihrig, Stefan (2014). Atatürk in the Nazi Imagination. Harvard University Press. 
 Megargee, Geoffrey (2000). Inside Hitler's High Command. University Press of Kansas. 
 Mitcham, Samuel W. (1992). Hitler's Commanders. Cooper Publishing Group. 
 Nicholls, Anthony James (2000). Weimar and the Rise of Hitler. Palgrave Macmillan. 
 O'Donnell, J. P. (2001) [1978]. The Berlin Bunker. Da Capo Press. 
 Orlow, Dietrich (2008). The Nazi Party, 1919–1945: A Complete History. Enigma Books. 
 Rees, Laurence (1999). The Nazis: A Warning from History. New Press. 
 
 Roth, J. et al. (2000). The Holocaust Chronicle. Publications International, Ltd. 
 Shirer, William (1994) [1960]. The Rise and Fall of the Third Reich. Gramercy. 
 Shirer, William (1979). Berlin Diary: The Journal of a Foreign Correspondent 1934–1941. Viking. 
 
 Thorwald, Jürgen (1967). [1951] Defeat in the East: Russia Conquers – January to May 1945. Ballantine Books.

Memoirs of people who knew or worked for Hitler

 Baur, Hans (2013) [1956]. I was Hitler's Pilot. Frontline Books. 
 Dietrich, Otto (1955). The Hitler I Knew: Memoirs of the Third Reich's Press Chief. Henry Regnery Company. 
 Döhring, Herbert, Krause, Karl Wilhelm, Plaim, Anna (2018) Living with Hitler: Accounts of Hitler's Household Staff. Greenhill Books. 
 Dollmann, Eugen (1967). With Hitler and Mussolini: Memoirs of a Nazi Interpreter. Hutchinson, London.  
 Hanfstaengl, Ernst (1994) [1957]. Hitler: The Missing Years. Arcade Publishing. 
 Hanisch, Reinhold (1939) I Was Hitler's Buddy. New Republic.
 Hoffmann, Heinrich (2011) [1955]. Hitler was my Friend: The Memoirs of Hitler's Photographer Frontline Books. 
 Junge, Traudl (2003) Until the Final Hour: Hitler's Last Secretary. Weidenfeld & Nicolson. 
 Kempka, Erich (2010) [1951]. I was Hitler's Chauffeur. Frontline Books. 
 
 Linge, Heinz (2009) [1980]. With Hitler to the End: The Memoirs of Adolf Hitler's Valet. Frontline Books. 
 Ludecke, Kurt (2011). I Knew Hitler. Archive Media Publishing. 
 Misch, Rochus (2014). Hitler's Last Witness: The Memoirs of Hitler's Bodyguard. Frontline Books. 
 Riefenstahl, Leni (1993). Leni Riefenstahl: A Memoir. St Martin's Press. 
 Schacht, Hjalmar (1955). My First Seventy-Six Years. Allan Wingate.  
 Schmidt, Paul (1951). Hitler's Interpreter: The Secret History of German Diplomacy 1935–1945. William Heinemann. 
 Schroeder, Christa (2009) [1985]. He was my Chief: The Memoirs of Adolf Hitler's Secretary. Frontline Books. 
 Speer, Albert (1997). Inside the Third Reich: Memoirs Simon & Schuster. 
 Strasser, Otto (1940). Hitler and I. New York: AMS Press. 
 Von Below, Nicolaus (2010) [1980]. At Hitler's Side: The Memoirs of Hitler's Luftwaffe Adjutant 1937–1945. Frontline Books. 
 Von Ribbentrop, Joachim (1954). The Ribbentrop Memoirs. Weidenfeld and Nicolson. 
 Wagener, Otto (1985). [1978]. Hitler: Memoirs of a Confidant Yale University Press

Articles

 Aigner, Dietrich "Hitler's Ultimate Aims – A Programme of World Dominion?" pp. 251–266 from Aspects of the Third Reich edited by H.W. Koch, Macmillan: London, 1985.
 Bankier, David "Hitler and the Policy-Making Process on the Jewish Question" pp. 1–20 from Holocaust and Genocide Studies, Volume 3, 1988.
 Bloch, Eduard "My Patient, Hitler" pp. 35–37 from Collier's, March 15, 1941.
 Bloch, Eduard "My Patient, Hitler" pp. 69–73 from Collier's, March 22, 1941.
 Binion, Rudolph "Hitler's Concept of "Lebensraum": the Psychological Basis" pp. 187–215 from History of Childhood Quarterly, Volume 1, 1973.
 Binion, R. "Foam on the Hitler Wave" pp. 552–558 from Journal of Modern History, Volume 46, 1974.
 Bracher, K.D. "The Role of Hitler: Perspectives of Interpretation" pp. 193–212 from Fascism: A Reader's Guide, edited by Walter Laqueur, Harmondsworth, 1979.
 Broszat, M. "Hitler and the Genesis of the 'Final Solution': An Assessment of David Irving's Theses" pp. 73–125 from Yad Vashem Studies, Volume 13,c1979; reprinted pp. 390–429 in Aspects of the Third Reich edited by H.W. Koch, London: Macmillan, 1985, .
 Bullock, A. "Hitler and the Origins of the Second World War" pp.  221–246 from European Diplomacy Between Two Wars, 1919–1939, edited by Hans W. Gatzke, Chicago: Quadrangle Books, 1972.
 Carr, William "The Hitler Image in the Last Half-Century" pp.  462–488 from Aspects of the Third Reich, edited by H.W. Koch, Macmillan: London, 1985.
 Erikson, Erik "The Legend of Hitler's Youth" pp.  370–396 from Political Man and Social Man edited by Robert Paul Wolff, New York, 1966.
 Fest, J. "On Remembering Adolf Hitler" pp. 19–34 from Encounter, Volume 41, October 1973.
 Hale, Oron James "Adolf Hitler: Taxpayer" pp.  830–842 from American Historical Review, Volume 60, 1955.
 Hauner, Milan "Did Hitler Want World Domination?" pp. 15–32 from Journal of Contemporary History. Volume 13, 1978.
 Hildebrand, K. "Hitler's War Aims" pp.  522–530 from The Journal of Modern History, Volume 48, Issue # 3 September 1976.
 Hillgruber, A. "Hitler's Program" pp. 49–55 from Germany and the Two World Wars. Cambridge: Harvard University Press, 1981.
 Hillgruber, A. "England's Place in Hitler's Plans for World Dominion" pp. 5–22 from Journal of Contemporary History, Volume 9, 1974.
 Hoffmann, Peter "Hitler's Personal Security" pp.  151–171 from Police Forces In History, edited by George Mosse, Beverly Hills, 1975.
 Hoffmann, Peter "Maurice Bavaud's Attempt to Assassinate Hitler in 1938" pp.  173–204 from Police Forces In History edited by G. Mosse, Beverly Hills, 1975.
 Kater, M. "Hitler in a Social Context" pp.  243–272 from Central European History, Volume 14, 1981.
 Kettenacker, Lothar "Social and Psychological Aspects of the Führer's Rule" pp. 96–132 from Aspects of the Third Reich, edited by H.W. Koch, Macmillan: London, 1985.
 Koch, H.W. "Hitler and the Origins of the Second World War Second Thoughts on the Status of Some of the Documents" pp.  125–143 from The Historical Journal, Volume 11, No. 1 1968.
 Koch, H.W. "Hitler's Programme and the Genesis of Operation 'Barbarossa'" pp.  285–324 from Aspects of the Third Reich, edited by H.W. Koch, Macmillan: London, 1985.
 Michaelis, Meier "World Power Status or World Dominion? A Survey of the Literature on Hitler's 'Plan of World Dominion' (1937–1970)" pp.  331–360 from Historical Journal. Volume 15, 1972.
 Mommsen, H. "Hitler's Position in the Nazi System" pp.  163–188 from From Weimar to Auschwitz. Oxford, 1991.
 Mommsen, H. "Reflections on the Position of Hitler and Göring in the Third Reich" pp. 86–97 from Reevaluating the Third Reich edited by Jane Caplan and Thomas Childers, New York, 1993.
 Preston, Paul "Franco and Hitler: The Myth of Hendaye 1940" pp. 1–16 from Contemporary European History, Volume 1, 1992.
 Robertson, E.M. "Hitler's Planning for War and the Response of the Great Powers" pp.  196–234 from Aspects of the Third Reich, edited by H.W. Koch, Macmillan: London, 1985.
 Trevor-Roper, H. "Hitlers Kriegsziele" pp.  121–133 from Vierteljahrshefte für Zeitsgeschichte, Volume 8, 1960, translated into English as "Hitler's War Aims" pp.  235–250 from Aspects of The Third Reich edited by H.W. Koch, London: Macmillan Ltd, 1985.
 Watt, D.C. "Hitler's Visit to Rome and the May Weekend Crisis: A Study In Hitler's Response to External Stimuli" pp. 23–32 from Journal of Contemporary History, Volume 9, 1974.
 Weinberg, G. "Adolf Hitler" pp. 5–38 from Visions of Victory: The Hopes of Eight World War II Leaders, Cambridge: Cambridge University Press, 2005.
 Weinberg, G. "Hitler's Private Testament of May 2, 1938" pp.  415–419 from Journal of Modern History, Volume 27, 1955.
 Weinberg, G. "Hitler's Image of the United States" pp. 1006–1021 from American Historical Review, Volume 69, Issue #4, July 1964.
 Weinberg, G. "Hitler and England: Pretense and Reality" pp.  299–309 from German Studies Review, Volume 8, 1985.
 
 Weinberg, G. "The World Through Hitler's Eyes" pp. 30–56 from Germany, Hitler and World War II Essays in Modern German and World History, Cambridge: Cambridge University Press, 1995.

See also
 Adolf Hitler in popular culture
 List of speeches given by Adolf Hitler
 List of books about Nazi Germany
 Bibliography of World War II

External links
 
 

Hitler, Adolf
Hitler, Adolf
Hitler, Adolf
Hitler, Adolf

Hitler, Adolf

Hitler, Adolf
 
Hitler